Opsarius koratensis is a fish in genus Opsarius of the family Cyprinidae. It is found in the Mekong and Chao Phraya basins and can reach  SL.

References

Fish of the Mekong Basin
Fish of Cambodia
Fish of Laos
Fish of Thailand
Opsarius
Fish described in 1931